Tokio is a software library for the Rust programming language. It provides a runtime and functions that enable the use of asynchronous I/O, allowing for concurrency in regards to task completion.

Tokio was released in August 2016 for Rust, a general-purpose programming language. Developed by Carl Lerche, Tokio began as a network application framework and supports features such as socket listening and broadcasting, allowing messages to be transferred between computers.

History 
Tokio began in August 2016 by Carl Lerche as a network application framework for Rust built on futures, allowing for network-based middleware and a non-blocking, or asynchronous, implementation of readiness interest to the reactor. Tokio was inspired by Finagle, a Scala-based asynchronous remote procedure call (RPC) system developed at Twitter for Java virtual machines (JVM), allowing distributed systems to communicate within a JVM. Tokio utilizes the lower-level Rust crate mio, itself using system calls such as epoll (Linux), kqueue (FreeBSD), and the input/output completion port (IOCP) API (Windows). The name "Tokio" is derived from Tokyo and mio. The preliminary version of Tokio was released in January 2017, followed by a full release in December 2020. In 2017, Tokio received a grant from the Mozilla Open Source Support fund. In April 2021, Tokio funded its first paid contributor, Alice Ryhl, for her work both developing the project and assisting its users.

While Rust has supported asynchronous functions since version 1.39, released in November 2019, it provides no facilities to execute them, requiring an external runtime for that purpose. Tokio provides a runtime that uses a multi-threaded work stealing scheduler. Rust's futures are lazily evaluated, requiring functions to call .await before they do any work. When .await is invoked, Tokio's runtime may pause the original future until its I/O completes, and unpauses a different task that is ready for further processing.

Notable users of Tokio include the development teams behind Discord and AWS Lambda. The JavaScript and TypeScript runtime Deno uses Tokio under the hood, in comparison to the JavaScript runtime Node.js, which uses the libuv library.

Features

Asynchronous code
Tokio allows for the usage of asynchronous functions in Rust through the creation of an asynchronous runtime. This can be accomplished through the #[tokio::main] macro.

For example:
#[tokio::main]
async fn main() -> Result<()> {
    let url = "https://en.wikipedia.org/";
    let text = reqwest::get(url).await?.text().await?;
    println!("{}", text);
    Ok(())
}

In this example, the reqwest crate is used to request the HyperText Markup Language (HTML) for English Wikipedia. To ensure that the request is not immediately handled, Tokio wraps the function call into an asynchronous runtime, waiting for the request to complete before calling println().

Tokio also includes a version of the Rust standard library that is designed for being used asynchronously. For example, tokio::fs::read_to_end(), which reads the contents of a file, is the asynchronous version of std::fs::read_to_end(). In addition, Tokio supports io_uring, a Linux asynchronous I/O syscall interface, in a separate crate named tokio-uring.

Compile-time green-threading
Tokio further allows users to create tasks, which are green threads, using a tokio::spawn() function. Green threads run at the user level, providing parallelism when native threads are not always available. Previous versions of Rust implemented green threading; this functionality was removed in Rust 1.0. Unlike futures, tasks do not need to use .await, as the task will be automatically executed when a thread is available.

Socket listening
Tokio is capable of listening on a socket through a non-blocking approach. In particular, the TcpListener structure binds a Transmission Control Protocol (TCP) socket listener to an address and asynchronously executes  function.

Broadcasting
Tokio provides a broadcast channel type, allowing for messages to be broadcast to multiple receivers. Upon sending a message, it is received by such receivers. This enables real-time communication and distributed systems, among other applications.

References

External links 
 
 
 Tokio on crates.io

2020 software
Free software programmed in Rust
Free computer libraries
Software using the MIT license